Wan Shaofen (born August 1930) is a retired Chinese politician who served as Communist Party Secretary of Jiangxi Province from 1985 to 1988, the first female provincial-level party chief of the People's Republic of China. Her career was closely tied to that of Hu Yaobang. She was persecuted during the Cultural Revolution because of her association with Hu, rose to prominence after he became General Secretary of the Chinese Communist Party in 1982, and lost her position as party chief of Jiangxi after Hu's downfall in 1987.

Life and career
Wan was born in August 1930 in a village near Nanchang, the capital of Jiangxi Province. Her parents were primary school teachers, and she is said to have descended from a Song dynasty defense minister.

Wan studied economics at National Chung Cheng University (now Nanchang University), where she participated in underground Communist activities in 1948. She formally joined the Chinese Communist Party (CCP) in 1952, after the founding of the People's Republic of China in 1949, and became a local leader in the Communist Youth League of China (CYL) and the official trade union. Besides Nanchang, she also worked in Shaanxi Province under the CYL leader Hu Yaobang, whom she befriended.

During the Cultural Revolution, she was persecuted for her association with Hu Yaobang, and was incarcerated and physically abused. She was denounced as a capitalist roader and a follower of the fallen leaders Liu Shaoqi, Deng Xiaoping, and Hu. She was politically rehabilitated in 1974 and returned to work in Jiangxi.

After Deng Xiaoping took power and began the reform era, Wan gained prominence thanks to her friendship with Hu, who became General Secretary of the Chinese Communist Party in 1982. She rose through the ranks in Jiangxi, working in labour and women's affairs. In 1984 she became head of the Jiangxi CCP Organization Department and a member of the Provincial Party Standing Committee. On 16 June 1985, she was elected by the Jiangxi Party Congress as the Provincial Party Committee Secretary. She gained attention worldwide as the first woman to hold a top provincial leadership position in the PRC.

Wan did not complete her term as Party Chief of Jiangxi, mainly because Hu Yaobang was purged in January 1987. In June 1988, she left her posts in Jiangxi and became briefly deputy party secretary of the All-China Federation of Trade Unions, maintaining her provincial rank. In December 1988, she was appointed deputy head of the United Front Work Department, in charge of Hong Kong, Macao and Taiwan affairs, and served in that position until September 1995. Starting in 1993 she also served two terms as a member of the National People's Congress Standing Committee; in 1998, she was named deputy chair of the National People's Congress Internal and Judicial Affairs Committee. She is the honorary president of China Charity Federation.

Legacy
Wan is best known as the first female provincial party chief in China. It would be more than 20 years before another woman, Sun Chunlan, took on the top provincial office, of Fujian, in 2009. However, Wan's background in the youth league, the trade union, and women's work was not well suited for running a provincial economy in the reform era. During her tenure, the economic growth of Jiangxi lagged behind neighbouring provinces, especially the coastal provinces of Zhejiang, Fujian, and Guangdong.

On the other hand, Wan made great contribution to women's work in her home province. She implemented major policies to improve the life of women, set up schools to train female cadres, organized public lectures to raise women's awareness of their rights, and drafted regulations protecting women and children. In 1984, the All-China Women's Federation issued an unprecedented circular calling for other women cadres to learn from Wan's leadership.

Personal life
After her divorce in the late 1960s, Wan raised her daughter as a single mother.

References

1930 births
Living people
Chinese women in politics
People's Republic of China politicians from Jiangxi
Chinese Communist Party politicians from Jiangxi
Political office-holders in Jiangxi
Nanchang University alumni
Politicians from Nanchang
Members of the 13th Central Committee of the Chinese Communist Party
Victims of the Cultural Revolution
Chinese women's rights activists
Members of the 12th Central Committee of the Chinese Communist Party
People of the Republic of China